The scaly-feathered weaver (Sporopipes squamifrons), also known as the scaly-feathered finch, is a species of bird in the family Ploceidae.

Range

It is found in Angola, Botswana, Namibia, South Africa, Zambia, and Zimbabwe.

References

External links
 Scaly-feathered Finch -  Species text in Weaver Watch.
 (Scaly-feathered weaver = ) Scaly-feathered finch  - Species text in The Atlas of Southern African Birds.

scaly-feathered weaver
Birds of Southern Africa
scaly-feathered weaver
Taxonomy articles created by Polbot